The UEFA Women's Under-19 Championship 2014 Final Tournament was held in Norway from 15 to 27 July 2014. The first qualification matches were played on 21 September 2013.

A competition record of 48 participating nations was set. For the first time Albania, Malta and Montenegro enter the competition.

The Netherlands won the final over Spain 1–0.

Tournament structure 
The regulations make up for the following tournament structure:

Venues
The matches were played in six cities, Ullevaal National Stadium was the final venue.
 Ullevaal Stadion, Oslo (28,000)
 Sarpsborg Stadion, Sarpsborg (4,700)
 Tønsberg Gressbane, Tønsberg (3,600)
 Mjøndalen Arena, Mjøndalen (2,100)
 Strømmen Stadion, Strømmen (1,800)
 UKI Arena, Jessheim (1,200)

Qualification
There were two separate rounds of qualifications held before the final tournament.

Qualifying round

In the qualifying round 44 teams were drawn into 11 groups. The group winners and ten best runners-up of each group advance. The draw was held on 20 November 2012.

Elite round

In the elite round the 21 teams from the first qualifying round were joined by top seeds Germany, England and Spain. The 24 teams of this round were drawn into six groups of four teams. The group winners and the runners-up team with the best record against the sides first and third in their group advanced to the final tournament.

Group stage
The seven teams advancing from the second qualifying round joined host nation Norway. Ireland qualified as best runners-up. The draw of groups was held on 29 April in Oslo.

The top two teams of each group advance to the semi-finals.

Tie-breaking
If two or more teams were equal on points on completion of the group matches, the following tie-breaking criteria were applied:
 Higher number of points obtained in the matches played between the teams in question;
 Superior goal difference resulting from the matches played between the teams in question;
 Higher number of goals scored in the matches played between the teams in question;
If, after having applied criteria 1 to 3, teams still had an equal ranking, criteria 1 to 3 were reapplied exclusively to the matches between the teams in question to determine their final rankings. If this procedure did not lead to a decision, criteria 4 to 7 were applied.

If only two teams were tied (according to criteria 1–7) after having met in the last match of the group stage, their ranking would be determined by a penalty shoot-out.

All times are in Central European Summer Time (UTC+02:00).

Group A

Group B

Knockout stage
In the knockout stage, extra time and penalty shoot-out are used to decide the winner if necessary.

For the first time in the competition history Ireland has reached the semi-finals. Their semi-final against the Netherlands was a rematch of the pairing in the second qualifying round, which ended in a goalless draw. With a 4–0 win the Netherlands reached the final for the first time.

Semifinals

Final

Goalscorers
6 goals
 Vivianne Miedema

2 goals

 Synne Skinnes Hansen
 Marie Dølvik Markussen
 Savannah McCarthy
 Nahikari García
 Stina Blackstenius

1 goal

 Lucinda Michez
 Claudia Walker
 Inessa Kaagman
 Jeslynn Kuijpers
 Marit Clausen
 Synne Jensen
 Lisa Naalsund
 Megan Connolly
 Keeva Keenan
 Clare Shine
 Zoe Ness
 Carolina Richardson
 Caroline Weir
 María Caldentey
 Sonia Fraile
 Alba Redondo
 Marta Turmo

Own goals
 Molly Bartrip (playing against Sweden)
 Dominique Janssen (playing against Scotland)
 Rachael O'Neill (playing against Netherlands)

References

External links
UEFA.com

 
2014
Women's Under-19 Championship
2014
2014 in women's association football
2014 in Norwegian women's football
2014–15 in Spanish women's football
2014–15 in Dutch women's football
2014–15 in Republic of Ireland women's association football
2014 in Swedish women's football
2014 in Scottish women's football
2014–15 in Belgian football
2014–15 in English women's football
July 2014 sports events in Europe
2014 in youth association football